Ellen Rocche (born July 19, 1979) is a Brazilian model.

Career
She began her career on the Sunday TV program Qual é a música? (literally, "What's the music?") with Silvio Santos on the Brazilian channel SBT. She has also acted in some chapters of the Globo program Zorra Total.

She joined the cast of a reality show based loosely on the Dutch Big Brother, dubbed Casa dos Artistas, in which famous people ("B" celebrities, in lieu of the usual anonymous participants) were locked together in a house and then gradually voted out. Rocche later refused to take part in a similar reality show by Rede Record, A Fazenda - where B-lister celebrities lived in a farm - to sign a contract with Rede Globo.

Ellen Roche was also featured on the Dream Girl Cam for the Venice Online website, and played a Brazilian version of the Lara Croft character, to promote the game Tomb Raider III in Brazil.

Filmography

Television

References

External links

 
 Official website

1979 births
Living people
Actresses from São Paulo
Brazilian people of Italian descent
Brazilian female models